Gideon Rubin (born 1973) is an Israeli artist who works with themes such as childhood, family and memory.

The grandson of the Israeli painter Reuven Rubin and the son of a diplomat, Rubin was greatly influenced by art and culture growing up. Rubin had made abstracted and faceless portraits, which are inspired by images from old photo albums, paparazzi shots of celebrities and paintings by old masters.

Rubin has had numerous international one-man shows. He lives and works in London.

Education 
 2002: MFA, Slade School of Fine Art, University College, London
 1999: BFA, School of Visual Arts, New York

Selected Collections 

Gideon Rubin has work in a number of private collections in  London, Hong Kong, New York, Paris and beyond. Public collections include the Herzliya Museum for Contemporary Art, Israel; The Zabludowicz Collection, London; Sender Collection, Germany; The Speyer Family Collection, NY; The Seavest Collection, NY; Ruinart, France; Fondation Frances, Senile, France; McEvoy Foundation for the Arts, San Francisco.

Exhibitions 

Recent notable solo exhibitions include Warning Shadows at Galerie Karsten Greve, Cologne; Fragments at Gallery EM, Seoul; The Kaiser's Daughter at Hosfelt Gallery, San Francisco; Black Book at The Freud Museum, London; If This Not Be I at Alon Segev Gallery, Tel Aviv; Memory Goes as Far as This Morning at the Museum of Contemporary Art Chengdu, China and the San Jose Institute of Contemporary Art, California; Questions of Forgiveness, Galerie Karsten Greve Paris.

Selected group exhibitions include The Conversation at Minnesota Street Project, San Francisco; How to Travel in Time at Apexart, New York; Water, Heart, Face at Jerusalem Biennale 2017; Mirror Mirror at Hosfelt Gallery, San Francisco; The Reading Room, ROKEBY, London; John Moores Painting Prize 2014, Walker Art Gallery, Liverpool; Summer Show at the Royal Academy of Arts, London; To Have a Voice at the Mackintosh Museum, Glasgow School of Art, Glasgow; No New Thing Under the Sun curated by Gabriel Coxhead at the Royal Academy of Art, London.

Publications  
 Gideon Rubin, monograph with texts by Gabriel Coxhead, Martin Herbert, Aya Lurie, Sarah Suzuki (Art/Books, July 2015 ) 
 Black Book by Gideon Rubin (Freud Museum London, 2018) 
 Gideon Rubin (Rokeby, 2007)
 Gideon Rubin, Others (Galerie Karsten Greve, Paris, 2010)

References

External links 
 Gideon Rubin Homepage
 Gideon Rubin at Galerie Karsten Greve
 Gideon Rubin at Hosfelt Gallery 
 Gideon Rubin at Alon Segev Gallery

Living people
Israeli artists
1973 births
School of Visual Arts alumni
Alumni of the Slade School of Fine Art